An elliptic equation can mean:
 The equation of an ellipse
 An elliptic curve, describing the relationships between invariants of an ellipse
 A differential equation with an elliptic operator
 An elliptic partial differential equation